Alfred René Jean Paul Ubbelohde  FRS (14 December 1907 – 7 January 1988) was a Belgian-born English physical chemist.

Education, early life and career
Ubbelohde was born in Antwerp, Belgium, in 1907. He was educated at St Paul's School, 1920-1926 and at Christ Church, Oxford, 1926-1930. He was senior scholar of Christ Church from 1931-1933. He then became a senior researcher in the Department of Thermodynamics at Oxford, 1933-1935. This was followed by excursions as a Dewar Fellow of the Royal Institution, London, 1936-1940 as Principal Experimental Officer at the Ministry of Supply, 1940-1945 and as Professor of Chemistry at Queen's University, Belfast, 1945-1954. He was elected as a Fellow of the Royal Society in 1951.

In 1954, Ubbelohde became a professor of thermodynamics at Imperial College London, a position he held until 1975. In 1961 he was awarded CBE; from 1961 to 1975 he was the head of the Chemical Engineering Department at Imperial College; following this he was a senior research fellow at Imperial College from 1975-1988.

Research
Ubbelohde's research interests included chemical thermodynamics, combustion, explosions and detonations, ionic melts, graphite and intercalation compounds. His group was the first to synthesise highly oriented pyrolytic graphite (HOPG). Over the course of his career, Ubbelohde wrote six books and some 400 publications. Ubbelohde was the chair of the Solvay Conferences on Chemistry (London), from 1959 to 1980. The Ubbelohde effect, which is the observation that deuteration increases hydrogen bond length, is named after him.  He is also credited with coining the term proton conductor. He also is known for studying life from a thermodynamic perspective, and for his eccentric study of the thermodynamics of pigs. In 1960 he bought a pig farm where he raised over 100 pigs and studied them from a thermodynamic perspective. He authored numerous books on chemistry during his career.

Awards and honours
Ubbelohde was elected a Fellow of the Royal Society (FRS) in 1951. He received the Liversidge Award of the Royal Society of Chemistry in 1959.

References

1907 births
1988 deaths
Thermodynamicists
British physical chemists
Fellows of the Royal Society